Erling Andersen (born 22 September 1960 in Bergen, Hordaland) is a retired male race walker from Norway.

Achievements

External links

Norwegian international athletes - A

1960 births
Living people

Norwegian male racewalkers
Athletes (track and field) at the 1984 Summer Olympics
Athletes (track and field) at the 1988 Summer Olympics
Olympic athletes of Norway
20th-century Norwegian people